A puppet monarch is a majority figurehead who is installed or patronized by an imperial power to provide the appearance of local authority but to allow political and economic control to remain among the dominating nation. 

A figurehead monarch, as source of legitimacy and possibly divine reign, has been the used form of government in several situations and places of history.

There are two basic forms of using puppets as monarchs (rulers, kings, emperors):
 A figurehead in which the monarch is a puppet of another person or a group in the country who rules instead of the nominal ruler.
 A puppet government under a foreign power.

Examples of the first type are the Emperors who were the puppets of the shōguns of Japan and the kings who were the puppets of the Mayor of Palace in the Frankish kingdom. Client kingdoms under the Roman Republic and Roman Empire and the British Empire's colonial relationship with King Farouk of Egypt in the 1950s are examples of the second type.

List of puppet kings and queens

Classical antiquity
 Qin Er Shi, Emperor of China's Qin Empire – dominated by his eunuch Zhao Gao
 Emperor Xian of Han of China – dominated by the warlord Dong Zhuo, his successors Li Jue and Guo Si, and finally the Wei Kingdom founded by Cao Pi before being forced to abdicate  
 Philip II Philoromaeus of the last Seleucid, King of Syria –  ruled as client king for the Roman Republic and Pompey

Late antiquity
 Leo I the Thracian, Roman emperor appointed by Aspar, but broke free
 Libius Severus, second Roman emperor appointed by Ricimer
 Olybrius, third Roman emperor appointed by Ricimer
 Glycerius, Roman emperor appointed by Ricimer's nephew, Gundobad
 Romulus Augustulus, Roman emperor appointed by his general father, Orestes

Post-classical period
 Ecgberht I of Northumbria puppet ruler for the Danes
Baldwin I, Latin Emperor – installed to rule the Latin Empire by the Republic of Venice after the Fourth Crusade
John, King of England – nominally ruled as a vassal for Pope Innocent III after 1213 
 John Balliol of Scotland – puppet king for King Edward I of England
 Musa, a puppet Ilkhan ruler in Mongol Persia
 Henry VI Lancaster of England – largely dominated by advisors such as Queen Margaret of Anjou and William de la Pole, 1st Duke of Suffolk

Early modern period
 John Sigismund Zápolya, Ottoman puppet king of Hungary contesting Holy Roman Emperor Ferdinand I of Hapsburg's claim to the throne
 Manco Inca, Sapa Inca of Tawantinsuyu – installed by the Spanish Empire, later revolted and founded the Neo-Inca State
 Simeon Bekbulatovich Russian Tsar – ruled for one year as Puppet monarch of Ivan the Terrible
 Moctezuma II, Tlatoani (Emperor) of Tenochtitlan and Aztec Triple Empire
 Joseph Nasi, a Ottomans puppet manger as Duchy of Naxos

Napoleonic era
 Elisa Bonaparte, Italian ruler as Grand Duchess of Tuscany and Princess of Lucca
 Louis Bonaparte of the Kingdom of Holland
 Jérôme Bonaparte, of Kingdom of Westphalia created from territories of Prussia and the former Holy Roman Empire (present-day cultural Germany) after the Battle of Jena-Auerstedt 
 Joseph Bonaparte, of Napoleonic Spain during the Peninsular War and of the Neapolitan Kingdom after the French invasion of Naples 
 Elector and later King, Frederick Augustus I of Saxony, appointed as Napoleonic Duke of Warsaw (present-day Poland, Belarus, and Lithuania)

Late modern period
 Rulers of the princely states of India under paramountcy of the British East India Company and later the British Raj 
Mubarak al-Sabah – signed an agreement with the British Empire to make the Sheikhdom of Kuwait a British protectorate 
Pedro V of Kongo – ruled the Kingdom of Kongo (modern-day Angola, Gabon, the Democratic Republic of the Congo, and the Republic of the Congo) as a client king for the Portuguese Empire 
Gungunhana – Portuguese client ruler of the Gaza Empire, exiled after unsuccessful rebellion against Portuguese rule. 
Osman Mahamuud – client king of the Majeerteen Sultanate (modern-day Puntland) for the Italian Empire
Muhammad Rahim Bahadur II and Isfandiyar Jurji Bahadur – Russian client rulers of the Khanate of Khiva 
Emperor Gojong and Sunjong of Korea – ruled as puppets of the Japanese Empire after the Russo-Japanese War
Aimone of Savoy, King of Croatia – appointed by Fascist Italy after the Axis invasion of Yugoslavia as figurehead for Ante Pavelić's Ustaše regime
 Aisin-Gioro Puyi, Emperor of Manchukuo – former Emperor of China appointed to lead Japan's puppet state of Manchukuo 
 Bảo Đại, Emperor of Vietnam – emperor of the French protectorate of Annam and Japanese-occupied Vietnam, later chief of state of South Vietnam
Sisavang Vong, King of Luang Phrabang – client king of the French protectorate of Laos
Tashi Namgyal and Palden Thondup Namgyal – ruled Sikkim as protectorate of India after 1950. 
Sisowath Monivong, of Cambodia – king of the French protectorate of Cambodia

Monarchy
Political metaphors referring to people
Client state